This is a list of professional wrestling conventions.

History
A professional wrestling fan convention typically features a professional wrestling promotion's talent and alumni autograph signings, interviews, fan activities, memorabilia displays, meet-and-greets, and matches. One of the oldest professional wrestling fan convention is Cauliflower Alley Club established in 1965.

Canada

United Kingdom

United States

East Coast

|Icons of Wrestling
|
|2016-
|Philadelphia, PA
|Timothy Embler
|Held at the ECW Arena prior to House of Hardcore from 2016-2019 and Battleground Championship Wrestling (2021-present)

Midwest

New England

Southern United States

Southwest United States

West Coast

References

External links
Calendar of Indy Wrestling Shows, Autograph Signings & Conventions at About.com

Conventions